Gaur is a Hindu Rajput clan of India. They have ancient ancestry and find mention by James Tod as one of 36 royal races in his book Annals and Antiquities of Rajasthan The Gaur Rajputs once held a prominent position in Ajmer till the time of Prithviraj Chauhan. Gorwar region gets its name from this clan. In later years they lost the territories ruled by them. In 15th century, they fought at least 13 battles with Shekhawats  were defeated and were reduced to feudetory or jagirdars in Shekhawati region. The Rajgarh territory was one of the last bastion of Gaur Rajputs during the times of Mughal Emperors, Humayun and Akber, which was lost to Kishan Singh in 17th century. Gaur Rajputs remained allies to Mughal till the time of Aurangzeb, whose political decisions, alienated Rathods, Sisodias, Hadas and Gaur Rajput from Mughals. 

Some of them converted to Islam and are now part of Garha Biradari or Gaur Muslims, Musalman Rajputs group.

Outside, Rajasthan, the Chief of Chamraoli (near Unnao), a Gaur Rajput, was held in high esteem by Alwar Raj and was amongst the very few who were given honor of tazim. 

Sheopur town and fort was founded by Gaur rulers in 1573.

Their population today is found in Indian States of Rajasthan, parts of  Uttar Pradesh and parts of Madhya Pradesh.

References

Rajput clans of Rajasthan
Rajput clans of Uttar Pradesh
Rajput clans of Madhya Pradesh